White Light may refer to:
White light, a combination of lights of different wavelengths

Music
 White Light (The Corrs album), 2015
 White Light (Gene Clark album) and its title track, 1971
 White Light (Groove Armada album), 2010
 "White Light" (George Michael song), 2012
 "White Light" (Superfly song), 2015
 White Light/White Heat, a 1968 album by The Velvet Underground
 "White Light/White Heat" (song), the title track
 "White Light/Violet Sauce", a 2005 song by Namie Amuro
 "Wit licht" (or "White Light" in English), a 2008 song by Marco Borsato
 "White Light", a song by Gorillaz from the album Demon Days
 "White Light", a song by Shura from the album Nothing's Real
 "White Light", a song by Two Hours Traffic from their self-titled debut album

Literature
White Light (novel), a 1980 novel by Rudy Rucker

Film & Television
"White Light" (The 4400)
White Light, a 1991 film directed by Al Waxman
The Silent Army, a 2008 Dutch film also known in Dutch as Wit licht or in English as White Light
"White Light" (Mighty Morphin Power Rangers)

See also
Whitelighter, a type of character in the Charmed television series